In number theory, Sophie Germain's theorem is a statement about the divisibility of solutions to the equation  of Fermat's Last Theorem for odd prime .

Formal statement
 No two nonzero  powers differ by one modulo ; and 
  is itself not a  power modulo .

Conversely, the first case of Fermat's Last Theorem (the case in which  does not divide ) must hold for every prime  for which even one auxiliary prime can be found.

History
Germain identified such an auxiliary prime  for every prime less than 100.  The theorem and its application to primes  less than 100 were attributed to Germain by Adrien-Marie Legendre in 1823.

Notes

References
 Laubenbacher R, Pengelley D (2007) "Voici ce que j'ai trouvé": Sophie Germain's grand plan to prove Fermat's Last Theorem
 
 

Theorems in number theory
Fermat's Last Theorem